Alejandro de la Cruz Bentos (born May 3, 1978) is a retired Argentinian footballer.

Club career

Guaraní Antonio Francor
Bentos started out his career with Guaraní Antonio Franco in his native town of Corrientes in 1996.

Puente Seco de Corrientes
In 1999, he was part of Puente Seco de Corrientes title winning team. Due to his success with the club, he moved on to play with Deportivo Morón.

FAS
In 2001, he moved to El Salvador to play with one of the country biggest clubs, FAS. During his time with the Santa Ana club, he would go on to play an integral part in the club winning the league title 5 times from 2002 to 2005.

Loan to Puebla FC
He became a very consistent player and was named one of El Salvador's Most Valuable Players. Due to this, he received interest to play for various clubs outside of El Salvador, and in 2005, he was loaned to Puebla of Mexico. During his time at Puebla, he was part of the team that won the Primera A title.

Return to FAS
Personally though, Bentos saw little game time, and as a result, he soon returned to FAS. He continued to play there until December 2008, when he was released from the club due to poor performances and demanding to high a wage.

Nejapa FC
On December 19, he signed a six-month contract with Nejapa. For the Apertura 2009 season, he returned to FAS.

In 2011, Bentos reached 300 games playing in the Salvadoran Primera División.

Honours

Club 
FAS
 Primera División
 Champion: Clausura 2002, Apertura 2002, Apertura 2003, Apertura 2004, Clausura 2005, Apertura 2009
 Runners-up: Clausura 2001, Clausura 2004, Apertura 2007, Clausura 2008, Clausura 2011, Clausura 2013, Apertura 2013

References

External links
Alejandro de la Cruz Bentos at BDFA.com.ar 
 Alejandro de la Cruz Bentos at Soccerway 

1978 births
Living people
People from Corrientes
Argentine footballers
Association football midfielders
Deportivo Morón footballers
C.D. FAS footballers
Club Puebla players
Nejapa footballers
Expatriate footballers in Mexico
Expatriate footballers in El Salvador
Sportspeople from Corrientes Province